Henry Frederick Jensen AO, (12 July 1913 – 27 August 1998) was an Australian ALP politician, who served as a member of the New South Wales Legislative Assembly from 1965 until 1981. He was also Lord Mayor of Sydney from 1957 until 1965.

Born in Newtown, New South Wales, Jensen was educated at Gardiners Road Public School, Marist Brothers High School in Darlinghurst, and St. Joseph's College, Hunters Hill. He joined the Labor Party in 1929.  He worked as an electrician and became an organiser within the Australian Electrical Trades Union and a delegate to the Australian Trades and Labor Council. He subsequently established his own electrical contracting business and later worked in footwear distribution.

He served as an alderman on Randwick Municipal Council from 1950 until 1956, including Mayor of Randwick from 1954. He was an alderman on Sydney City Council from 1956 until 1965, and Lord Mayor of Sydney from 1957 until 1965.

He entered the New South Wales Legislative Assembly at the 1965 state election, as member for Wyong, which he represented until October 1973. He was re-elected in November 1973 as the representative for Munmorah, a seat he occupied until 28 August 1981.

From 1976 until 1981, Jensen held various ministerial positions in the cabinet of Premier Neville Wran. He died in Randwick, New South Wales.

References

 

1913 births
1998 deaths
Australian electricians
Australian trade unionists
Members of the New South Wales Legislative Assembly
Mayors and Lord Mayors of Sydney
Mayors of Randwick
Officers of the Order of Australia
People educated at St Joseph's College, Hunters Hill
Australian Labor Party members of the Parliament of New South Wales
20th-century Australian politicians
Councillors of Sydney County Council